The M65 atomic cannon, often called Atomic Annie, was an artillery piece built by the United States and capable of firing a nuclear device. It was developed in the early 1950s, at the beginning of the Cold War; and fielded between April 1955 and December 1962, in West Germany, South Korea and on Okinawa.

History

In 1949, Picatinny Arsenal was tasked with creating a nuclear-capable artillery piece. (The name Atomic Annie likely derives from the nickname Anzio Annie given to a pair of German K5 guns which were employed against the American landings in Italy.) The design was approved by the Pentagon, largely through the intervention of Samuel Feltman, chief of the ballistics section of the ordnance department's research and development division. A three-year developmental effort followed. The project proceeded quickly enough to produce a demonstration model to participate in Dwight D. Eisenhower's inaugural parade in January 1953. The gun was initially designated T131 and the carriage was T72.

The cannon was transported by two specially designed tractors in the same manner as railroad Schnabel cars. Both tractors were capable of independent steering in the manner of some extra-long fire trucks. The artillery piece could be unlimbered in 12 minutes, then returned to traveling configuration in another 15 minutes. The gun was deployed by lowering it from the tractors onto levelled ground. The whole gun assembly was balanced on a ball and socket joint so that it could be swung around the footplate. The traverse was limited by a curved track placed under the rear of the gun.

On May 25, 1953, at 8:30 a.m., the atomic cannon was tested at the Nevada Test Site (specifically Frenchman Flat) as part of the Upshot–Knothole series of nuclear tests. This was the first and only nuclear shell to be fired from a cannon. (The Little Feller 1 test shot of a W54 used a Davy Crockett weapon system,  which was a recoilless smooth-bore gun firing the warhead mounted on the end of a spigot inserted in the barrel of the weapon.)

After the successful test, at least 20 cannons were manufactured at Watervliet and Watertown Arsenals, at a cost of  each. They were deployed overseas to Europe and Korea, and frequently shifted around to avoid being detected and targeted by opposing forces. However, it remained a prestige weapon and was not retired until 1963.

Surviving units
Of the twenty M65s produced, at least seven survive on display.  Most no longer have their prime movers.
 U.S. Army Artillery Museum, Fort Sill, Oklahoma. This is the original Atomic Annie that fired the live nuclear shot. It was restored in 2010 and is now displayed with prime movers replacing those that were lost in an accident when the cannon was retrieved from Germany by the museum in 1964.
 United States Army Ordnance Training and Heritage Center, Petersburg, Virginia, with the two large prime movers attached
 National Museum of Nuclear Science & History, Albuquerque, New Mexico, with two prime movers
 Freedom Park, Junction City, Kansas, overlooking Fort Riley
 Rock Island Arsenal, Memorial Field, Rock Island, Illinois
 Watervliet Arsenal Museum, Watervliet Arsenal, Watervliet, New York, the manufacturing facility where all the pieces were all manufactured
 Yuma Proving Ground, Yuma, Arizona

The Virginia War Museum in Newport News, Virginia has been erroneously identified as possessing a  prototype of the M65. The weapon at the museum is actually a conventional  T1 Gun, one of two produced as part of a separate design program which was abandoned in favor of the T131  Atomic Cannon program. Both the T1 and T131/M65 share T72 carriages.

See also
 List of U.S. Army weapons by supply catalog designation (SNL D-57)?
 2A3 Kondensator 2P

References

External links 

 
 Atomic Annie fired during NATO Exercise Keystone, 1954

Nuclear artillery
Cold War artillery of the United States
280 mm artillery
Articles containing video clips
Military equipment introduced in the 1950s